Abu Francis (born 27 April 2001) is a Ghanaian footballer who plays as a midfielder for Belgian club Cercle Brugge.

Career

Club career
Francis was born in Ghana and was a part of the academy at Right to Dream and joined FC Nordsjælland in the summer 2019. Before his move to Nordsjælland in the summer 2019, Francis had already played a reserve team game for the club in July 2017 and three games for the U19's in the Torneo di Viareggio in March 2019. While playing at Right to Dream, Francis among other things was named as the best player at a J-League Youth tournament in Japan, scoring two goals in the final and helping his team lift the title.

He got his FC Nordsjælland debut on 14 July 2019 in the first league game of the 2019/20 season. Francis was in the starting line up in a 3–0 victory against AC Horsens in the Danish Superliga and played 74 minutes. On 25 July 2019 Nordsjælland announced, that they had extended Francis' contract until June 2023.

With a year left of his contract with Nordsjælland, the club confirmed on 19 August 2022, that Abu Francis had been sold to Belgian First Division A side Cercle Brugge, with the player signing a deal until June 2025 with an option for an additional season. Francis got his debut for the Belgian side on 27 August 2022 against Zulte Waregem.

References

External links
 
 

2001 births
Living people
Ghanaian footballers
Ghanaian expatriate footballers
Right to Dream Academy players
FC Nordsjælland players
Cercle Brugge K.S.V. players
Danish Superliga players
Belgian Pro League players
Association football midfielders
Ghanaian expatriate sportspeople in Denmark
Ghanaian expatriate sportspeople in Belgium
Expatriate men's footballers in Denmark
Expatriate footballers in Belgium